Mula Mukesh Goud (1 July 1959 – 29 July 2019) was an Indian politician and 3 time MLA (Member of Legislative Assembly) in Andhra Pradesh Andhra Pradesh Legislative Assembly. He served as a Minister for Backward classes welfare (2007) and Minister for marketing and warehousing (2009) in the undivided Andhra Pradesh.

Positions held

Death 
He died in the age of 60 at a private hospital in Hyderabad on 29 July 2019. He was suffering from throat cancer for the last two years and was in hospitals for treatment many times.

References

1959 births
2019 deaths
Telugu politicians
Indian National Congress politicians from Telangana
Politicians from Hyderabad, India
Telangana politicians